Kris Demeanor is a Canadian poet, musician and actor, who received a Canadian Screen Award nomination for Best Supporting Actor at the 3rd Canadian Screen Awards for his performance in the film The Valley Below.

Prior to his performance in the film, Demeanor worked primarily as a musician and poet, releasing six CDs and serving a term as poet laureate of Calgary, Alberta from 2012 to 2014. His song "I Have Seen the Future" formed the basis of Cam Christiansen's animated film of the same name, which was named to the Toronto International Film Festival's year-end Canada's Top Ten list in 2007.

In 2021 he appeared in Range Roads, the second film by The Valley Below director Kyle Thomas.

Discography
Kris Demeanor (1999)
Lark (2001)
Party All Night (2004)
Go Away (With Me) (2007)
The Guilt and the Shame: Tales of the Canadian West (2007)
These United States (2009)

References

External links
Kris Demeanor

21st-century Canadian poets
Canadian male film actors
Canadian male poets
Canadian male singer-songwriters
Canadian folk singer-songwriters
Canadian indie rock musicians
Male actors from Calgary
Musicians from Calgary
Living people
Poets Laureate of Calgary
21st-century Canadian male actors
21st-century Canadian male writers
21st-century Canadian male musicians
Year of birth missing (living people)